Davide Lanzafame (born 9 February 1987) is an Italian former professional footballer who played as a striker or right winger.

Club career

Juventus
Lanzafame, born in Turin to a Catanese father and a Piedmontese mother, grew up in the Juventus youth team and had been part of the Juventus youth side, competing in competitions such as Campionato Nazionale Primavera until 2006, before making his senior team debut for Juve during their 2006–07 season in Serie B campaign. Italy Under-21 boss Pierluigi Casiraghi called him up for the 2008 Toulon Tournament and listed him as a reserve for the Olympics that summer.

A.S. Bari
Ahead of the 2007–08 Serie A season, Juventus loaned Lanzafame to Serie B side, A.S. Bari. Lanzafame endured a highly successful loan spell in which he made 37 league appearances, scoring 10 goals. In April 2008, coach Antonio Conte compared him to Cristiano Ronaldo, stating that he has the possibility and potential to reach similar levels in his football and quoting "Lanzafame has improved tactically” to La Gazzetta dello Sport. “He is explosive, he sniffs the goal, and imposes his speed outside the area. If he improves and learns he can become like Cristiano Ronaldo." Lanzafame returned to Turin on 30 June 2008.

U.S. Città di Palermo
On 1 July 2008, Palermo announced to have finalised the signing of Lanzafame from Juventus in a co-ownership deal, for €2.5 million, as part of the deal that saw Amauri, move to Juventus, while Antonio Nocerino also transferred outright to Palermo . After a disappointing time with Palermo during the first half of the 2008–09 Serie A season, where Lanzafame saw little playing time and no first team action, co-owners, Juventus, ensured that a loan deal was executed, also wanting their youth product to remain in Serie A. On 26 December 2008, he moved from Palermo to Bari on loan for the remainder of the season. Lanzafame underwent a second successful spell with A.S. Bari, making 18 league appearances and scoring 2 goals. Following his second return from Bari, Lanzafame returned to Palermo, only to be loaned out to Serie A side, F.C. Parma. In his first full season of Serie A football, Lanzafame impressed, scoring 7 goals in 27 league matches. He also scored against his parent club in 3–2 win for Parma over Juventus on 9 May 2010.

Return to Juventus
On 25 June 2010, Palermo and Juventus agreed to extend the co-ownership deal for another year, with the Sicilian club loaning out the player to the bianconeri for the 2010–11 season. Lanzafame was expected to be a part of the building project of the new Juventus management, however, after just three league appearances in 5 months for Juventus, he was loaned to Brescia Calcio for the remainder of the 2010–11 Serie A season. Lanzafame made 13 appearances with Brescia, but failed to score. At the end of the season, he returned to Palermo.
Following his second comeback to Palermo in June 2011, his co-ownership was resolved in favor of the rosanero for free.

Calcio Catania
On 10 August 2011, Palermo confirmed to have sold Lanzafame to Calcio Catania on a co-ownership basis, for €1 million, as part of the deal that saw Matías Silvestre move in the opposite direction. Lanzafame was officially presented on 12 August 2011, alongside Mario Paglialunga and David Suazo. Upon joining his maternal descent-based club, Lanzafame made just 11 appearances and scored 1 goal during the 2011-12 Serie A season. In June 2012 Catania acquired him outright for free.

Lanzafame was subsequently loaned to Serie B side, U.S. Grosseto on 9 September 2012. He was a mainstay in the club's lineup, appearing in 16 matches and scoring 2 league goals during the first half of the 2012–13 Serie B season, before returning to Catania in January 2013. He was then immediately loaned out to Hungarian outfit, Budapest Honvéd at the request of coach Marco Rossi. At the club, Lanzafame teamed up with former Juventus youth teammate Raffaele Alcibiade.

Match-fixing scandal
When Budapest Honvéd learned that Lanzafame had been accused of manipulating matches during his time with Bari by FIGC, they terminated his loan deal, that would have run until 30 June, a month in advance. Lanzafame had scored five league goals in ten matches for the club before returning to Sicily. Upon returning to Catania, Lanzafame's fate in regard to the aforementioned matchfixing was officially learned on 5 July 2013. Prosecutor Stefano Palazzi had requested a four-year ban, however, Lanzafame saw his plea bargain accepted and will be suspended for 16 months with a €40,000 fine.

Perugia
On 12 August 2014, Lanzafame signed with Serie B club Perugia, joining Marco Rossi who also involved in the aforementioned scandal. The contract of Lanzafame was extended on 13 March 2015, which would last until 30 June 2017.

Budapest Honvéd
In 2016, Lanzafame returned to Budapest Honvéd FC and won the 2016–17 Nemzeti Bajnokság I season with the club.

He scored his first goal in the UEFA Champions League in the 2017–18 UEFA Champions League season against Hapoel Be'er Sheva F.C. at the Turner Stadium.

He became the top scorer of the 2017–18 Nemzeti Bajnokság I season by scoring 18 goals. Before the last round there were three players with 17 goals (Roland Varga of Ferencváros, and Soma Novothny of Újpest). However, none of the three players scored goals in the 33rd round, except for Lanzafame who scored a free-kick goal against Vasas SC.

Ferencváros
On 1 July 2018, Lanzafame was signed by Nemzeti Bajnokság I club Ferencváros. In an interview with the Nemzeti Sport, he said that he made his most difficult decision in his career so far after signing with Ferencváros.

Budapest Honvéd
On 12 August 2019, Lanzafame was returned third time to Nemzeti Bajnokság I club Budapest Honvéd FC.

Adana Demirspor
On 25 September 2020, Lanzafame was join to club Adana Demirspor.

Vicenza
On 1 February 2021, Lanzafame signed with Italian club Vicenza on a free-transfer. On 22 January 2022, his contract with Vicenza was terminated by mutual consent after he missed most of the season up to that point due to injury.

Career statistics

Honours

Budapest Honvéd
Nemzeti Bajnokság I: 2016–17
Hungarian Cup: 2019–20

Ferencváros
Nemzeti Bajnokság I: 2018–19

Individual
Nemzeti Bajnokság I top scorer: 2017–18, 2018–19

References

External links

1987 births
Living people
Footballers from Turin
Italian footballers
Italy under-21 international footballers
Association football forwards
Juventus F.C. players
S.S.C. Bari players
Palermo F.C. players
Parma Calcio 1913 players
Brescia Calcio players
Catania S.S.D. players
F.C. Grosseto S.S.D. players
Budapest Honvéd FC players
A.C. Perugia Calcio players
Novara F.C. players
Ferencvárosi TC footballers
Adana Demirspor footballers
L.R. Vicenza players
Serie A players
Serie B players
Nemzeti Bajnokság I players
TFF First League players
Italian expatriate footballers
Expatriate footballers in Hungary
Italian expatriate sportspeople in Hungary
Expatriate footballers in Turkey
Italian expatriate sportspeople in Turkey
People of Sicilian descent